Thai Air Force Welfare Department Football Club (Thai สโมสรฟุตบอลกรมสวัสดิการทหารอากาศ), is a Thai professional football based in Pathum Thani Province. The club was founded in the name Air Force Welfare Department Football Club. They play in Regional League Division 2 Bangkok region from Promoted of Khǒr Cup.

In 2015 season they changed the club name to Royal Thai Army and changed logo after they promoted to division 2. This football club is Reserve team of Army United F.C.

In 2017 season The club is currently come back to play in the 2017 Thai League Amateur Tournament Bangkok Metropolitan Region.

In 2018 season The club play Thai FA Cup first time.

Stadium and locations by season records

Season By Season record

P = Played
W = Games won
D = Games drawn
L = Games lost
F = Goals for
A = Goals against
Pts = Points
Pos = Final position

QR1 = First Qualifying Round
QR2 = Second Qualifying Round
R1 = Round 1
R2 = Round 2
R3 = Round 3
R4 = Round 4

R5 = Round 5
R6 = Round 6
QF = Quarter-finals
SF = Semi-finals
RU = Runners-up
W = Winners

Honours
Regional League Division 2
Runners-up : 2008
Khǒr Royal Cup (ถ้วย ข.)
Champion : 2014

References
 Royal Thai Army
 https://www.youtube.com/watch?v=InhWrmG94Wk
 https://www.fourfourtwo.com/th/features/liiklaangaimngaay-9-kunchuuedangopraiflhruuthiiaipaimrungkabsuekliikrng?page=0%2C6
 http://www.smmsport.com/m/article.php?a=4195

External links
 https://www.facebook.com/thaiarmyfootball

Association football clubs established in 2011
Football clubs in Thailand
Pathum Thani province
2011 establishments in Thailand
Military association football clubs in Thailand